15350 Naganuma, provisional designation , is a stony background asteroid from the inner regions of the asteroid belt, approximately  in diameter. It was discovered on 3 November 1994, by Japanese astronomers Yoshio Kushida and Osamu Muramatsu at the Yatsugatake South Base Observatory. The likely S-type asteroid has a rotation period of 2.5 hours. It was named for the town of Naganuma in northern Japan.

Orbit and classification 

Naganuma is a non-family asteroid from the main belt's background population. It orbits the Sun in the inner asteroid belt at a distance of 1.7–3.0 AU once every 3 years and 8 months (1,343 days; semi-major axis of 2.38 AU). Its orbit has an eccentricity of 0.27 and an inclination of 5° with respect to the ecliptic. The body's observation arc begins with its official discovery observation at the Yatsugatake South Base Observatory in November 1994.

Naming 

This minor planet was named after the town of Naganuma, located on the island of Hokkaido in northern Japan, where the "Artists Atelier Village" was promoted for many years with more than 20 workshops. The official  was published by the Minor Planet Center on 13 October 2000.

Physical characteristics 

Naganuma is an assumed S-type asteroid, which agrees with its determined geometric albedo (see below).

Rotation period 

In November 2005, a rotational lightcurve of Naganuma was obtained from photometric observations by Donald Pray at the Carbuncle Hill Observatory  on Rhode Island, United States. Lightcurve analysis gave a rotation period of  hours with a brightness amplitude of 0.20 magnitude. Concurring periods of 2.58348, 2.5835 and 2.587 hours were also determined by Vladimir Benishek at Sopot Astronomical Observatory  and Petr Pravec at Ondřejov Observatory.

Diameter and albedo 

According to the survey carried out by the NEOWISE mission of NASA's Wide-field Infrared Survey Explorer (WISE), Naganuma measures 4.36 kilometers in diameter and its surface has an albedo if 0.256. The Collaborative Asteroid Lightcurve Link adopts Petr Pravec's revised WISE-albedo of 0.20 and calculates diameter of 4.34 kilometers based on an absolute magnitude of 14.16.

Notes

References

External links 
 Asteroid Lightcurve Database (LCDB), query form (info )
 Dictionary of Minor Planet Names, Google books
 Discovery Circumstances: Numbered Minor Planets (15001)-(20000) – Minor Planet Center
 
 

015350
Discoveries by Yoshio Kushida
Discoveries by Osamu Muramatsu
Named minor planets
19941103